Vac-Man is an action figure created as the nemesis of Stretch Armstrong. Vac-Man is suggested to be from a faraway galaxy.  

Unlike the Stretch Action figures which contained a syrup-like liquid inside a rubber sheath, Vac-Man (and associated models like the Vac-Pac which were the heroic enemies of Vac-Man) contained a grainy solid, produced from ground-up corn cobs. By attaching the provided pump to a socket on Vac-Man's head, air could be sucked out until the body became rigid. It could then be stretched, but unlike Stretch Armstrong, it would retain its stretched shape until the air was let back in.  Hasbro continued the production of Vac-Man in 2018, one year after continuing production of the Stretch action figures, which included Fetch Armstrong and the Stretch Octopus. A second variant of Vac-Man was created, this time half the size of the original Vac-Man (14 inches). This smaller version could be pumped by pulling up on the head then pushing down to make a built-in pump.
Vac-Man was made by Cap Toys (later purchased by Hasbro) starting in 1994. It also has 3-4 different types of versions of Vac-Man.

External links
 Vac Man at io9
 Chemistry in the Toy Store, David A. Katz.
 Toys of Yesterday: Stretch Armstrong

Toy characters